The history of the University of Bristol can be said to have begun in 1909 when the university gained a royal charter which allowed it to award degrees. Like most English universities, Bristol evolved from earlier institutions, most notably University College, Bristol (founded 1876), Bristol Medical School (1833) and the Merchant Venturers' Technical College (founded as a school 1595 and which became the university engineering faculty.

Beginnings

As early as 1906 Conwy Lloyd Morgan had stated his intention to give up the principalship of University College, Bristol. Sir Isambard Owen, nephew of Isambard Kingdom Brunel, became the first vice-chancellor of the university and worked upon the detail of the university's charter. Owen is also credited with the design of the university gowns, with the colour said to have been based upon the colour of the rocks of the Avon Gorge after rain. One area of early controversy was the re-advertising of some chair positions and the decision not to give one, Cowl, a reappointment. This caused the resignation of the Chair of Physics, Arthur P. Chattock.

Henry Overton Wills became the first chancellor of the university. On Wills' death, Haladane was invited to succeed him. The installation of Haladane was used to honour all those who had been involved in the creation of the university and 70 honorary degrees were awarded by the university. This act, coming from a university not yet three years old caused some controversy and led to public criticism of the university in The Observer.

After the death of their father, Henry Wills and George Wills donated money for the building of a university building in memory of their father. He met with George Oatley (later Sir George Oatley) to plan the building of what was to become the Wills Memorial Building which the brothers requested would be built to last for 400 years. When the Wills family acquired Royal Fort gardens as a site they were given to the university and were to be the site of a castle like building which became the physics department.

Expansion
In 1911, George Wills acquired the athletic ground at Coombe Dingle and in 1920 he bought the Victoria Rooms which became the Students' Union building. World War I caused a financial crisis with the university losing around 20% of its fee income but the government agreed to make up this loss because of important contributions which Bristol made to the study of poison gas and explosives. Economic problems continued after the war when it was announced that government funding of universities was to be cut. On 9 June 1925, the Wills Memorial Building was officially opened by King George V and Mary.

It was during the interwar years that Bristol's reputation as a university began to increase. In 1920 Helen Wodehouse was appointed as Chair of Education, the first woman to be appointed in such a role, and in 1928 Winifred Lucy Shepland was appointed as the first woman registrar of any British university. The growing strength was exemplified by the "poaching" of academics from other universities and the award of a Nobel Prize to Bristol graduate Paul Dirac for his work on quantum mechanics.

From the early years of its formation, the university brought higher education to working people, with H. G. Leonard, a lecturer in history, becoming president of the Bristol branch of the Workers' Educational Association. After the war, government grants allowed the setting up of departments of extramural adult education. Bristol University also began to have an effect on the city of Bristol, when the university laboratories and the city laboratories combined to train health visitors at Canynge Hall. This had a pronounced effect on the City of Bristol's health, with death rates halving to 11 per 1,000 and the infant mortality rate falling from 165 per 1000 to 57 per 1000. However, the state of the medical school was described by the Ministry of Health described it as being at "sixes and sevens". The problem was the continuing rivalry between the General Hospital and Bristol Royal Infirmary, Sir George Wills had offered to build a new university hospital if the two could resolve their differences but this failed to create an agreement between them.

Scientific discovery
The 1920s and 1930s saw great scientific breakthroughs in the chemistry and physics departments. Sir Nevil Mott arrived from the University of Cambridge . His work on "solid state physics" led to the development of the transistor and the growth of industry around solid state electronics. The physics department became home to the Sutton Group, which worked on klystron and magnetron valves (the latter important in the development of radar). A "future physics" professor, Peter Fowler, used his scientific knowledge to destroy German radar jamming devices during the war.

After the war Tomas Lovejoy succeeded Isambard Owen as vice-chancellor after a short interim period. Lovejoy was responsible for the creation of a system whereby the appointment of professors was made by joint senate and council committees after the two organisations disagreed over his replacement as Chair of Physics.

Damage occurred to the Wills Memorial Building during the war caused then chancellor to give a defiant speech. Loveday remained as vice-chancellor despite being past retirement age until the end of the war when he was replaced by Phillip Morris.

Post-War era
During the 1950s new buildings for the medicine and engineering departments were provided on St Michael's Hill. The geography department were able take over the old. A new chemistry building was also planned on the slopes of St Michael's Hill but the project ran into difficulty when Bristol City Council's compulsory purchase orders displaced some local residents. New buildings to be built in Berkeley Square caused similar complaints. These would become home of the Department of Education as it was clear that Royal Fort house would prove too small.

Further expansion
In the 1950s, the government indicated that it would give support to students being able to choose any university within the national system at which they could study. This loss of local students caused some to see the university as a kind of alien "intellectual colony" disconnected to the university. The development made it necessary for the university to invest in student accommodation. Clifton Hill House had already been opened soon after the gaining of the charter and it operated as a girls' hall of residence and Wills Hall was opened in 1929. To cope with increasing student numbers Churchill Hall, Hiatt Baker Hall and Badock Hall were built.

The 1960s saw a large increase in the number of British universities built after Harold Wilson was elected prime minister. Many of these new institutions received criticism but Bristol was now seen as an older more established institution and was able to embark on a period of academic expansion. There was a new Department of Inorganic Chemistry and a Department of Biochemistry. However the greatest expansions occurred in the arts with the creation of the drama, theology, sociology, politics, and social and economic history departments.

Sir Phillip Morris retired in 1966 but during his time as vice-chancellor the university tripled in size and witnessed the building of many departments such as the School of Veterinary Science and the School of Architecture.

Student protest
In 1968 the first large scale student protest occurred when students staged a sit in over allegations that they were unable to control their own union. The protest lasted over the weekend. At this time the vice-chancellorship had passed to John Harris who was said to be nonplussed by the protest. However, he died one week later after collapsing in his office. Further disagreement between the university and the union occurred over the issue of "reciprocal membership" of the union meaning that any students from Bristol would be able to use the union. This escalated into an 11-day sit-in at Senate House which gained Bristol national headlines, although it has been argued that the protest enjoyed little student support.

Several protests occurred in Bristol in 2010 in response to government spending cuts in education, including the increasing of tuition fees, and the scrapping of Education Maintenance Allowance in England. On 24 November, approximately 2000 students from the university and nearby schools gathered outside of the university and marched through the streets of Bristol. This was followed by an occupation of the Students Union building by students who criticised the union for failing to represent them on these issues. (Main article: University of Bristol Union#History) On 7 December a second occupation occurred, this time in the central university building of Senate House. The students occupying the building made a list of demands, including "greater student representation in Senate meetings" and "That the Vice-Chancellor, Eric Thomas, write and send an open letter to the Government condemning cuts in the education budget and appealing to them not to implement these policies, and to publicly call for Vice-Chancellors across the country to unite against these cuts, any rise in tuition fees and the removal of Educational Maintenance Allowance and Aimhigher." The occupiers received a considerable amount of support from members of staff. The occupation ended on 17 December 2010, with students leaving voluntarily and stating: "Although the occupiers' main demand [...] was not met, the occupation has, in many ways, yielded much more meaningful outcomes than being granted particular requests by senior management."

Conservative cuts
Under the Conservative government of Margaret Thatcher, funding for universities was cut and Bristol's income was reduced by some 15%. This resulted in the selective closure of some departments, including Russian, education and architecture. A compromise agreement was eventually found but this episode damaged the research strength of the university.

Recent history
In May 2009, Bristol celebrated its centenary. As part of the celebrations degrees were bestowed upon individuals who had given extraordinary service to the Bristol community.

See also

Third-oldest university in England debate

References

External links

University of Bristol
University
Bristol
Bristol